Glyphipterix halimophila is a species of sedge moth in the genus Glyphipterix. It was described by Oswald Bertram Lower in 1893. It is found in south-eastern and western Australia.

References

Moths described in 1893
Glyphipterigidae
Moths of Australia